Eduardo Eugenio Lobos Landaeta (born 30 July 1981) is a Chilean football manager and former footballer who played as a goalkeeper.

Managerial career
In 2020, he began his managerial career as the manager of Deportes Iberia in the Segunda División Profesional de Chile. In 2022, he moved to San Antonio Unido at the same division.

Honours

Club
Colo-Colo
 Primera División de Chile (1): 2002 Apertura

Coquimbo Unido
 Primera B de Chile (1): 2018

References

External links

Eduardo Lobos at Memoria Wanderers (in Spanish)

1981 births
Living people
People from Curicó
Chilean footballers
Chilean expatriate footballers
Chile under-20 international footballers
Chile international footballers
Colo-Colo B footballers
Colo-Colo footballers
Audax Italiano footballers
PFC Krylia Sovetov Samara players
Unión Española footballers
Santiago Wanderers footballers
San Marcos de Arica footballers
Cobresal footballers
Everton de Viña del Mar footballers
Coquimbo Unido footballers
Tercera División de Chile players
Chilean Primera División players
Russian Premier League players
Primera B de Chile players
Expatriate footballers in Russia
Chilean expatriate sportspeople in Russia
Association football goalkeepers
Chilean football managers
Deportes Iberia managers